The Rivers State Ministry of Energy and Natural Resources is a government ministry of Rivers State, Nigeria in charge of monitoring, controlling, and regulating activities related to energy and natural resources in the state. The mandate of the ministry is "To meet the energy needs of the Rivers State population and maximize their participation in the upstream/downstream sectors." The current commissioner is Uchechukwu Nwafor. Ministry headquarters are located at State Secretariat building, Port Harcourt.

Structure
The ministry consists of the following departments:

Natural Gas
Petroleum
Conflict Resolution
Research and Statistics
Administration
Department of Finance and Accounts.

See also

List of government ministries of Rivers State

Energy and Natural Resources
Rivers State
Ministries established in 2003
2003 establishments in Nigeria
2000s establishments in Rivers State
Natural resources ministries
Energy in Rivers State